Daniel Malanga Kanu (born 14 November 2004) is an English professional footballer who plays as a forward for Charlton Athletic.

Career
Kanu joined Charlton Athletic at under-11 level. On 2 February 2022, after scoring 31 goals in all competitions across Charlton's youth sides, Kanu signed his first professional contract with the club. Ten days later, on 12 February 2022, Kanu made his debut for Charlton, coming on as an 82nd-minute substitute in a 2–1 League One loss against Wigan Athletic.

On 22 November 2022, Kanu scored his first professional goal for the club in a 3–2 defeat away at Plymouth Argyle in the EFL Trophy.

Personal life
Born in England, Kanu is of Sierra Leonean descent. He attended Dartford Grammar School, where he represented his school on numerous occasions as part of the athletics team. He specialised in long-distance running and even set a handful of school records.

Career statistics

Honours

Individual
Charlton Athletic Young Player of the Year: 2021–22

References

Living people
2004 births
People educated at Dartford Grammar School
English sportspeople of Sierra Leonean descent
English footballers
Association football forwards
Black British sportsmen
English Football League players
Charlton Athletic F.C. players